Shaker families were groups of followers within Shaker communities.

The leading group in each village was the Church Family, and it was surrounded by satellite families that were often named for points on the compass rose. Each village was governed by a leadership team consisting of two men (Elders) and two women (Eldresses).  Shakers lived together as brothers and sisters. Each house was divided so that men and women did most things separately. They used different staircases and doors. They sat on opposite sides of the room in worship, at meals, and in "union meetings" held to provide supervised socialization between the sexes. However, the daily business of a Shaker village required the brethren and sisters to interact. Though there was a division of labor between men and women, they also cooperated in carrying out many tasks, such as harvesting apples, food production, laundry, and gathering firewood.

References

Shaker communities or museums